Hicham Chatt (born 18 February 1969) is a retired Moroccan long-distance runner who specialized in the marathon and cross-country running.

He finished sixteenth in the long race at the 2003 World Cross Country Championships, and twelfth in 2004. For this he won a bronze medal with the Moroccan team in the team competition in 2003. In 2004 the team finished fourth. He won the Cross de Atapuerca meeting in 2006. Chatt also competed in the marathon at the 2007 World Championships without finishing the race.

His personal best marathon time is 2:07:59 hours, achieved in April 2006 in the London Marathon. He has 28:21.48 minutes in the 10,000 metres, achieved in May 2004 in Hengelo.

Achievements

References

1969 births
Living people
Moroccan male long-distance runners
Moroccan male marathon runners
World Athletics Championships athletes for Morocco
20th-century Moroccan people
21st-century Moroccan people